Sarah Strohmeyer (born December 17, 1962) is an American author of eighteen crime novels and humorous books about relations between men and women. She is best known for her Bubbles Yablonsky series about a Pennsylvania hairdresser who is drawn into solving various crimes and murders.

Early life and education
Strohmeyer grew up in Bethlehem, Pennsylvania. She attended Tufts University, where she graduated with a degree in international relations.

Career
After graduation, Strohmeyer began work as a journalist for Home News Tribune in New Brunswick, New Jersey, The Plain Dealer in Cleveland, and later Valley News. 

In 1997, Strohmeyer published Barbie Unbound, which she wrote in response to her seeing several mothers refuse to allow their children to play with the doll due to it being perceived as being a "bimbo".

Strohmeyer's work has been book The Cinderella Pact was reviewed by The Roanoke Times. The book was later turned into a 2010 movie, Lying to be Perfect, which aired on Lifetime.

Awards
2001 Agatha Award, Best First Novel for Bubbles Unbound

Bibliography

Bubbles Yablonsky series
 Bubbles Unbound (2001)
 Bubbles in Trouble (2002)
 Bubbles Ablaze (2003)
 Bubbles a Broad (2004)
 Bubbles Betrothed (2005)
 Bubbles All The Way (2006)
 ‘'Bubbles Reboots'’ (2018)

Stand-alone novels
The Secret Lives of Fortunate Wives (2005)
The Cinderella Pact (2006)
The Sleeping Beauty Proposal (2007)
Sweet Love (2008)
The Penny Pinchers Club (2009)
Kindred Spirits (2011)
Smart Girls Get What They Want (2012)
How Zoe Made Her Dreams (Mostly) Come True (2013)
The Secrets of Lily Graves (2014)
This Is My Brain on Boys (2016)

Non-fiction
Barbie Unbound: A Parody of the Barbie Obsession (1997)

Personal life
Strohmeyer has two grown children and lives in Middlesex, Vermont with her husband. She is currently the town clerk.

References

External links
Official website

1962 births
Living people
21st-century American novelists
21st-century American women writers
Agatha Award winners
American women novelists
Novelists from Pennsylvania
Tufts University alumni
Women mystery writers
Writers from Bethlehem, Pennsylvania